Liu Haili (born 24 December 1984, in Haicheng) is a retired Chinese heptathlete. She represented her country at the 2008 Summer Olympics. Her personal best score is 6132 points, achieved at the 2005 National Games in Nanjing.

Achievements

References

Team China 2008

1984 births
Living people
Chinese heptathletes
Athletes (track and field) at the 2008 Summer Olympics
Olympic athletes of China
Athletes from Liaoning
Sportspeople from Anshan
People from Haicheng, Liaoning